The Tobique Narrows Dam is a hydroelectric dam built on the Tobique River in the Canadian province of New Brunswick and operated by NB Power corporation. Its powerhouse has a capacity of 20 megawatts.

The dam and powerhouse were built between 1951 and 1953 near the confluence of the Tobique River with the Saint John River, several kilometers north of the village of Perth-Andover and 35 km upriver from the Beechwood Dam.

Highway 105 crosses the Tobique River along the top of the dam. A fish ladder helps migratory fish circumvent the 24 m head of the dam. The dam spans the river between Perth Parish on the south side, and the Tobique First Nation Indian reserve on the north side, both in Victoria County.

External links

NB Power Corporation

Dams in New Brunswick
Hydroelectric power stations in New Brunswick
Buildings and structures in Victoria County, New Brunswick
Dams completed in 1953
1953 establishments in New Brunswick
Dams with fish ladders